NGC 385 is an unbarred lenticular galaxy located in the constellation Pisces. It was discovered on November 4, 1850 by Bindon Stoney. It was described by Dreyer as "pretty faint, pretty small, round, northeastern of 2.", the other being NGC 384. Along with galaxies NGC 375, NGC 379, NGC 382, NGC 383, NGC 384, NGC 386, NGC 387 and NGC 388, NGC 385 forms a galaxy cluster called Arp 331.

References

External links
 

0385
18501104
Pisces (constellation)
Unbarred lenticular galaxies
003984